Sevasti Todua (born 13 May 1976) is a Georgian former professional football player.

1976 births
Living people
Footballers from Georgia (country)
Association football defenders
Expatriate footballers from Georgia (country)
Georgia (country) international footballers
FC Samtredia players
FC WIT Georgia players
FC Lokomotivi Tbilisi players
FC Torpedo Kutaisi players
FC Elista players
Expatriate footballers in Russia
Russian Premier League players
FC Zestafoni players
FC Metalurgi Rustavi players
FC Zugdidi players
FC Guria Lanchkhuti players
FC Dinamo Batumi players
FC Merani Tbilisi players
FC Borjomi players